William Walker may refer to:

Arts
 William Walker (engraver) (1791–1867), mezzotint engraver of portrait of Robert Burns
 William Sidney Walker (1795–1846), English Shakespearean critic
 William Walker (composer) (1809–1875), American Baptist song leader and composer, compiler of Southern Harmony (1835)
 William Aiken Walker (1839–1921), American artist
 Blind Willie Walker (1896–1933), American blues guitarist and singer
 Bill Walker (actor) (William Franklin Walker, 1896–1992), African-American film actor (To Kill a Mockingbird)
 William Walker (muralist) (1927–2011), muralist in Chicago
 William Walker (baritone) (1931–2010), singer with the Metropolitan Opera
 Wee Willie Walker (1941–2019), American soul blues singer
 Sugar Belly (William Walker), Jamaican mento musician

Military
 William H. T. Walker (1816–1864), Confederate general in the American Civil War
 William Stephen Walker (1822–1899), Confederate brigadier general
 William Walker (filibuster) (1824–1860), American filibuster in Latin America; briefly ruled Nicaragua
 William George Walker (1863–1936), recipient of the Victoria Cross
 William Walker (RFC airman), British First World War flying ace
 William Walker (RAF officer) (1913–2012), at the time of his death the oldest survivor of the Battle of Britain
 William J. Walker, United States Army general

Politics
 William Walker (Quebec merchant) (1790–1863), Lower Canada merchant and politician
 William Walker (Quebec politician) (1797–1844), Lower Canada lawyer and politician
 William Walker (Wyandot leader) (1800–1874), Native American leader, sometime chief of the Wyandot Nation in Ohio and Kansas
 William Adams Walker (1805–1861), U.S. Representative from New York
 William Walker (filibuster) (1824–1860), American mercenary who usurped the office of President of Nicaragua in 1856–1857
 William Walker (New South Wales politician) (1828–1908), Australian politician
 William Walker (New South Wales colonial politician) (1820–1889), Australian politician
 William Campbell Walker (1837–1904), New Zealand politician
 William Froggatt Walker (1841–1890), Australian politician
 William H. Walker (New York City politician) (1842–1916), American politician, father of New York City mayor Jimmy Walker
 William H. Walker (Canadian politician) (1847–1913), member of the Legislative Assembly of Quebec
 William Walker (trade unionist) (1871–1918), Irish trade unionist and socialist
 William O. Walker (1896–1981), American publisher, politician and editor
 William Walker (diplomat) (born 1935), former US ambassador to El Salvador and leader of the Kosovo Verification Mission
 William Walker (Iowa politician) (1834–1899), American politician in Iowa

Sports
 William Walker (Australian cricketer) (1835–1886), Australian cricketer
 William Walker (footballer, born 1871) (1871–1907), Scottish footballer
 Billy Walker (jockey) (William Walker, 1860–1933), African-American jockey
 William Walker (footballer, born 1884), Scottish footballer (Clyde FC and Scotland)
 William Walker (English cricketer) (1889–1938), English cricketer
 Willie Walker (footballer, born 1891) (1891–1968), English football outside left
 Willie Walker (Queen's Park footballer) (1888–1974), Scottish footballer
 Willie Walker (footballer, born 1906), Scottish footballer
 Willie Walker (rugby union) (born 1978), New Zealand rugby union footballer
 William Walker (cyclist) (born 1985), Australian racing cyclist
 Will Walker (Australian footballer) (born 1999), Australian rules footballer
 William Walker (baseball) (fl. 1937), baseball center fielder in the Negro leagues

Other
 William Walker (principal) (1704–1761), British Principal of New Inn Hall
 William Walker (surgeon) (1813–1875), Scottish surgeon
 William R. Walker (architect) (1830–1905), American architect
 William H. Walker (Vermont judge) (1832–1896), Vermont attorney and judge
 William Walker (1838–1908), Scottish-born Australian writer
 William Walker (priest) (died 1911), Dean of Aberdeen and Orkney
 William R. Walker (publisher), 19th-century English printer and publisher
 William David Walker (1839–1917), bishop in the Episcopal Church
 William Walker, 1st Baron Wavertree (1856–1933), British businessman, art collector, and racehorse breeder
 William Walker (diver) (1869–1918), diver who saved Winchester Cathedral from collapse
 William Hultz Walker (1869–1934), American chemistry professor and a pioneer of chemical engineering
 William F. Walker (1937–2007), President of Auburn University 2001–2007
 William R. Walker (born 1944), Canadian leader in The Church of Jesus Christ of Latter-day Saints
 Black Racer (DC Comics) or Sgt. William "Willie" Walker, a character in DC Comics

See also 
 Bill Walker (disambiguation)
 Billy Walker (disambiguation)